SunComm Technology is a Taiwan multinational computer technology and GSM Voice over IP gateway manufacturer. The main products in 2010 focused on GSM VoIP gateways & IP surveillance camera devices. Core members have been engaging in the communication & networks industry since 1977.

History
SunComm Technology Co., Ltd
In 1977, developed communication & networks industry.
In 2007, developed GSM gateway.
In 2008, developed VoIP.
In 2010, developed GSM to VoIP Gateway.

Operations

Dongguan, China Liaison Office has   
been set up at Guan-Dong Province to provide service from Taiwan and China.
SunComm Technology Co., Ltd provides:
VoIP
Wifi IP Phone 
gateway 2, 4, 6, 8, 16, 24 ports
SIP Proxy Server for 200 users with 2, 4, 8 FXS, FXO embedded
SIP IP PBX with 72 SIP Line and 24 SIP Trunk 
Web Call Server: with 10 concurrent call, 30 concurrent call
GSM VoIP Device
GSM Gateway (FWT) 
GSM VoIP gateway: 1 channel, 2 channels 
GSM E1 Channel Bank (30 channels)
(Dual band 900/1800 MHz or Quad band 900/1800/1900 MHz)

Products
A VoIP phone has the following hardware components:
Keypad & touchpad to enter phone number and text.
Speaker & earphone and microphone.
General purpose processor (GPP) to process application messages.
Display hardware to feedback user input and show caller-id & messages.
A voice engine or a digital signal processor (DSP) to process RTP messages. Some IC manufacturers provides GPP and DSP in single chip.
Ethernet or wireless network hardware to send and receive messages on data network.
Power source might be a battery or DC source. Some VoIP phones receive electricity from Power over Ethernet.
ADC and DAC converters: To convert voice to digital data and vice versa.

Other devices
There are several Wi-Fi enabled mobile phones and PDAs that come pre-loaded with SIP clients, or are capable of running IP telephony clients. Some VoIP phones also support PSTN phone lines directly.
Gateway devices
Analog telephony adapters are connected to the internet or Local area network using an Ethernet port and have sockets to connect one or more PSTN phones. Such devices are sent out to customers who sign up with various commercial VoIP providers allowing them to continue using their existing PSTN based telephones.

Another type of gateway device acts as a simple GSM base station and regular mobile phones can connect to this and make VoIP calls. While a license is required to run one of these in most countries these can be useful on ships or remote areas where a low-powered gateway transmitting on unused frequencies is likely to go unnoticed.

 Ethernet hub
 Voice over IP
E1 GSM Channel Bank with VoIP
GSM Fixed Phone (FWP)
IP Phone / Wifi IP
Skype Phone Desktop
 Router
3G Wifi AP Router
 Gateway
 
3G GSM Gateway
GSM Gateway
PoE Switch
 Server
3G Hsupa Hsdpa EvdoEdge Modem
GSM Remote SIM Switch /  Server
Wifi ATA / VoIP Gateway
 Terminal
3G VoIP Terminal
CDMA VoIP Terminal
GSM VoIP Terminal
 Modem
GSM / Wifi Dual Mode
 Payphone

Disadvantages of VoIP phones

IP networks, particularly residential Internet connections, are easily congested. This can cause poorer voice quality or the call to be dropped completely. VoIP phones, like other network devices can be subjected to denial-of-service attacks as well as other attacks, especially if the device is given a public IP address. Due to the latency induced by protocol overhead they do not work as well on satellite Internet and other high-latency Internet connections. Requires Internet access to make calls outside the local area network (LAN) unless a compatible local PBX is available to handle calls to and from outside lines. VoIP phones and routers depend on mains electricity for power, unlike PSTN phones, which are supplied with power from the telephone exchange. However, this can be mitigated by installing a UPS.

See also
 3G(3rd-generation)
 Business telephone system (PBX)
 GSM (Global System for Mobile Communications)
 List of companies of Taiwan
 Network address translation (NAT)
 Network bridge
 Power over Ethernet (PoE)
 Session Initiation Protocol (SIP)
 Skype
 Voice over IP (Voice over Internet Protocol)
 Wi-Fi
 Wireless access point (WAP)

References
公司登記資料查詢(經濟部商業司)
GSM operators to face Lottery Commission's anger
Avaya CEO Predicts Broad Adoption Of SIP-Powered UC
Virtual PBX Offers IP Solution

External links
 SunComm Technology Co., Ltd
 GSM 900 Frequency and Provider Chart
 GSM 1800 Frequency and Provider Chart
 Windows Phone 7 will be GSM-only in 2010
 AT&T lets 3G VoIP onto iPhone
 China locks down Voip
 Gmail gets Voip support
 From Voip to Unified Communications: Simplify System Management

1977 establishments in Taiwan
Electronics companies of Taiwan
Companies based in New Taipei
Manufacturing companies based in New Taipei
Computer companies established in 1977
Electronics companies established in 1977
Taiwanese brands